Lakefront may refer to:

Boulevard Lakefront Tour, non-competitive bicycle ride in downtown Chicago, Illinois, USA
Chicago Lakefront Trail, 18-mile multi-use path in Chicago, Illinois along the coast of Lake Michigan
Cleveland Burke Lakefront Airport, public airport on the shore of Lake Erie in Cuyahoga County, Ohio, USA
Cleveland Lakefront Station, Amtrak's station in Cleveland, Ohio
Lakefront, Syracuse, one of the 26 officially recognized neighborhoods of Syracuse, New York
Lakefront Arena, 10,000-seat multi-purpose arena in New Orleans, Louisiana and was built in 1983
Lakefront Brewery, Milwaukee's first microbrewery to achieve Regional Craft Brewery status
Lakefront Consolidated School, school located in Tangier, Nova Scotia, Canada
New Orleans Lakefront Airport, public use airport northeast of New Orleans, in Orleans Parish, Louisiana, USA